P. R. Francis (3 December 1924 – 10 May 2002) was an Indian National Congress politician and an Indian National Trade Union Congress (INTUC) leader from Thrissur and Member of the Legislative Assembly of Ollur to Kerala Legislative Assembly in 1957, 1960, 1970 and 1977. He was the President of the District Congress Committee of Trichur and served INTUC in the capacity of State Secretary and Vice President. He has organized workers of tile factories, plantation units, headload workers etc. in Thrissur and Ollur through Indian National Trade Union Congress. He has also participated in Quit India Movement.
 
P R Francis Memorial Award, an award instituted in memory of P.R. Francis for the best social worker by P.R. Francis Smaraka Samithi. The award is presented at Ollur Town Hall and includes a cash prize of Rs 11,111 and memento.

References

Indian National Congress politicians from Kerala
Malayali politicians
People from Thrissur district
1924 births
2002 deaths
Trade unionists from Kerala
Kerala MLAs 1957–1959
Kerala MLAs 1960–1964
Kerala MLAs 1970–1977
Kerala MLAs 1977–1979